Aritz Bagües Kalparsoro (born 19 August 1989 in Errenteria) is a Spanish former cyclist, who competed as a professional from 2011 to 2022. He competed in the Vuelta a España each year from 2018 to 2021. He now works as a directeur sportif for UCI ProTeam .

Major results
2013
 5th Overall Tour of China I
 5th Overall Boucles de la Mayenne
2014
 1st  Overall Vuelta Ciclista a León
2016
 7th Klasika Primavera
2018
 9th Overall Tour of Norway
2021
  Combativity award Stage 8 Vuelta a España
2022
 2nd Overall Ronde de l'Oise
1st  Mountains classification

Grand Tour general classification results timeline

References

External links

1989 births
Living people
Spanish male cyclists
Cyclists from the Basque Country (autonomous community)
People from Errenteria
Sportspeople from Gipuzkoa
20th-century Spanish people
21st-century Spanish people